Mark Fernand Severin (5 January 1906 at Ixelles, Belgium – 10 September 1987 at Uccle, Belgium) was a Belgian artist and graphic designer who lived in England for most of his life.

Life

Mark Severin was the son of Fernand Severin (1876–1931), a poet. Described as one of the most outstanding engravers of his generation, Mark Severin specialised in fine miniature work, including postage stamps and book illustrations. He made close to five hundred bookplates, of which a great number are on erotic subjects. He was also active as an advertisement designer in Great Britain, including posters for Imperial Airways and the London Underground.

In 1935, Severin married Nina Holme, a children's book illustrator, daughter of Charles Geoffrey Holme, editor of The Studio, an illustrated fine arts and decorative arts magazine founded and, until 1919, edited by his father, Charles Holme. Mark and Nina had two sons: Erik and Geoffrey.

A catalogue raisonné of Severin's works was published in 1993.

Published works
Making a Bookplate (How to do it series) London: The Studio Publications, 1949
Your Wood Engraving London: Sylvan Press, 1953
Joint authorship
Mark Severin and Anthony Reid Engraved Bookplates, European Exlibris 1950-70 Pinner: Private Libraries Association, 1972

His work illustrating others' books
Thomas & The Sparrow by Ian Serraillier, illustrated by Mark Severin. Oxford University Press, 1946
Woman in Detail by Patrick Miller. 5 collotype plates after drawings by Severin.  London: The Golden Cockerel Press, 1947
The Homeric Hymn to Aphrodite A New Translation by F.L. Lucas, Fellow of King's College, Cambridge. Ten Engravings by Mark Severin. London: Golden Cockerel Press, 1948
Circe and Ulysses Translated by William Browne.  Illustrations by Mark Severin. London: Golden Cockerel Press, 1954
Aollonius of Tyre.  Historia Apollonii Regis Tyri Translated by Paul Turner.  Six engravings by Mark Severin.  London: Golden Cockerel Press London, 1956
Eve's Moods Unveiled by Jonathan Hanaghan.  Copper engravings by Mark Severin.  Dublin: Runa Press, 1957
Five Japanese Love Stories by Ihara Saikaku, illustrated with wood engravings by Mark Severin. London: Folio Society, 1958
Stories by Karel van de Woestijne, illustrations by Mark Severin.  Amsterdam: World Library Association, 1959
Beowulf the Warrior Ian Serraillier, illustrations by Mark Severin. New York: Henry Z. Walck, Inc., 1961.

Bibliography
Chambers, David. Mark Severin's book illustrations in The Private Library Autumn 1980, published by the Private Libraries Association
Chambers, David. Mark Severin's Bookplates in The Private Library Spring 1993, published by the Private Libraries Association
Lee, B. N., 1983, "Mark Severin"  The Bookplate Journal, vol. 1, no. 1, March 1983.
Leytens, Fr., Mark F. Severin En Zijn Werk Amsterdam: Wereldbibliotheek 1954
Rousseau, Antoine and Gastmans, Andre (preface), Marc Severin Graphiste/Grafisch Ontwerper/Graphic Designer Sint-Martens-Latem, uitgeverij De Dijle 1993.  The oeuvre catalogue of Severin's work, with texts in three languages (French, Dutch and English). Contains a list of all the ex-libris he designed, as well as all his other works; this is the most complete book so far, although it does not contain any frankly erotic documents, so as to be accessible to all publics!

References

External links
an example of his work at the bottom of the page
Mark Severin on Artnet

Belgian engravers
Belgian wood engravers
Belgian illustrators
Belgian poster artists
Belgian stamp designers
1987 deaths
1906 births
People from Ixelles
20th-century engravers